The historic monuments of Cairo have been listed in several iterations dating back to the late nineteenth century that were produced by the Comité de Conservation des Monuments de l'Art Arabe which was succeeded by the Egyptian Antiquities Organization ( which is now the Supreme Council of Antiquities).

Maps
There were several maps published by related governmental authorities detailing the location of registered historic monuments that were color coded according to the period of their foundation. The first large scale map was published in 1924 by the Survey of Egypt. A second map was published in 1927. Another map was published in 1948, both in Arabic and in English. This last map of "Mohammadan Monuments of Cairo" is perhaps the best known.

List of Monuments

List of Unlisted Monuments

See also

References

Cairo-related lists
Heritage registers
List